The Telangana State Tourism Development Corporation (TSTDC) is a state government agency which promotes tourism in Telangana, India.

Aims
The aim of TSTDC is to provide infrastructure, conveyance and other facilities to tourists visiting Telangana. Part of their mission is also to promote unknown tourist spots in Telangana.

The Chief Minister KCR appointed Pervaram Ramulu IPS Retd, former Director General of police as the first chairman of TSTDC on 18-03-2015.

TSTDC owns a considerable size of transport fleet 63 which includes high end Volvo and Mercedes Benz coaches, a/c and non a/c coaches. The fleet will be deployed for conducting regular and on demand packages.

TSTDC have a chain of Haritha Hotels which are spread across the state of Telangana at all major tourist destinations with a size of 33 hotels which includes wayside amenities on major national highways.

Special Attractions

While focusing on the forefront of adventure and eco-tourism projects, TSTDC is organizing adventure clubs at Bhongir Fort for rock climbing activities and trekking, adventure jeep ride into the forest at Kawal Wildlife Sanctuary, Jannaram in Adilabad District.

TSTDC owns the largest water fleet - about 95 which comprises small and big boats — when compared with any other tourism corporation. The corporation operates leisure based cruises and water sports at different lakes and rivers of the state, parasailing activity at Hussain Sagar, etc., are very popular for leisure cruises apart from American pontoon boats.

TSTDC presents sound and light shows at Golconda Fort, Shilparamam and the Taramati Baradari. These shows have recorded narrations (English, Hindi and Telugu) along with imaginative use of music, sound and light effects.

Awards
 National Tourism Award 2013-14 under the category Best Tourism friendly Golf Course.

References

External links
 Telangana Tourism, tourism.telangana.gov.in

Tourism in Telangana
State agencies of Telangana
Organisations based in Hyderabad, India
State tourism development corporations of India
Industries in Hyderabad, India
2014 establishments in Telangana
Government agencies established in 2014
Telangana Police SI Syllabus in Telugu 2021